Like the other eight provinces in South Africa, Eastern Cape is governed by a parliamentary system, with the premier of the province selected from the leadership of the largest party or coalition in the provincial legislature. The premier then selects the members of his Executive Council (cabinet) from among his fellow MPLs; they are assigned to the different departments in the government, even though the departments' day-to-day business is run by the Heads of the Department (HOD), who are also appointed by the premier.

Executive Council

References

Government of the Eastern Cape
Eastern Cape